In chemistry, the equivalent concentration or normality (N) of a solution is defined as the molar concentration ci divided by an equivalence factor feq:

Normality =

Definition 
Normality is defined as the number of gramme or mole equivalents of solute present in one litre of solution. The SI unit of normality is Eq/L.

Normality formula 
Normality (N) = Mass of Solute (in gm) / (Equivalent Weight of Solute × Volume of the Solution (in liters))

Usage 

There are three common types of chemical reaction where normality is used as a measure of reactive species in solution:

In acid-base chemistry, normality is used to express the concentration of hydronium ions (H3O+) or hydroxide ions (OH−) in a solution. Here,  is an integer value. Each solute can produce one or more equivalents of reactive species when dissolved.
In redox reactions, the equivalence factor describes the number of electrons that an oxidizing or reducing agent can accept or donate. Here,  can have a fractional (non-integer) value.
In precipitation reactions, the equivalence factor measures the number of ions which will precipitate in a given reaction. Here,  is an integer value.

Normal concentration of an ionic solution is also related to conductivity (electrolytic) through the use of equivalent conductivity.

Medical 

Although losing favor in the medical industry, reporting of serum concentrations in units of "eq/L" (= 1 N) or "meq/L" (= 0.001 N) still occurs.

Examples 

Normality can be used for acid-base titrations. For example, sulfuric acid (H2SO4) is a diprotic acid. Since only 0.5 mol of H2SO4 are needed to neutralize 1 mol of OH−, the equivalence factor is:

feq(H2SO4) = 0.5

If the concentration of a sulfuric acid solution is c(H2SO4) = 1 mol/L, then its normality is 2 N. It can also be called a "2 normal" solution.

Similarly, for a solution with c(H3PO4) = 1 mol/L, the normality is 3 N because phosphoric acid contains 3 acidic H atoms.

Criticism of the term "normality" 

Normality is an ambiguous measure of the concentration of a given reagent in solution. It needs a definition of the equivalence factor, which depends on the definition of the reaction unit (and therefore equivalents). The same solution can possess different normalities for different reactions. The definition of the equivalence factor varies depending on the type of chemical reaction that is discussed: It may refer to equations, bases, redox species, precipitating ions, or isotopes. Since a reagent solution with a definite concentration may have different normality depending on which reaction is considered, IUPAC and NIST discourage the use of the terms "normality" and "normal solution".

See also 
 Equivalent (chemistry)
 Normal saline, a solution of NaCl, but not a normal solution. Its normality is about 0.154 N.

References

External Links 

 Analytical Chemistry 2.1, by David Harvey (Open-source Textboox) | Chapter 16.1: Normality
 Normality: Definition, formula, equations, type, example, .

Analytical chemistry
Chemical properties